Johannes Hendrik "Heino" Senekal (born 20 October 1975 in Tsumeb) is a retired Namibian rugby union lock. Senekal competed for the Namibia national rugby union team at the 1999 Rugby World Cup finals, 2003 Rugby World Cup finals and the 2007 Rugby World Cup finals, playing 10 matches in aggregate.

He was a member of the Welsh team Cardiff Blues in the Celtic League and the Cornish Pirates, from Cornwall.

Senekal attended high school at Sentraal High School in Bloemfontein, South Africa.

References

1975 births
Living people
Expatriate rugby union players in England
Expatriate rugby union players in Wales
Namibia international rugby union players
Namibian Afrikaner people
Namibian expatriate rugby union players
Namibian expatriate sportspeople in England
Namibian expatriate sportspeople in Wales
Namibian people of South African descent
Namibian rugby union players
Rugby union locks
Rugby union players from Tsumeb
White Namibian people